Karel Kváček (17 June 1912 – 23 July 1986) was a Czech wrestler. He competed in the men's freestyle featherweight at the 1936 Summer Olympics.

References

External links
 

1912 births
1986 deaths
Czech male sport wrestlers
Olympic wrestlers of Czechoslovakia
Wrestlers at the 1936 Summer Olympics
Place of birth missing